What to Eat Now is a six-part series, broadcast on BBC Two and presented by chef Valentine Warner. The basic message behind the series is that people should eat food that is in season. The programme was first broadcast on 15 September 2008. A second and final series was broadcast in 2009.

The series has covered autumnal foods, both meats such as rabbit and pigeon, and fruits and vegetables and fungi, including apples, pears, pumpkins, chicory, beetroot and truffle as part of the series.
In looking at apples, the show visited Benedictine monks, and talked about how they could find the best apples to make a dish called "apple charlotte".
In looking at beetroot, the show visited a farmer who practiced biodynamic farming, believing that the phases of the moon could affect plant growth.

The show travelled to Lindisfarne to illustrate mussel catching. Warner has also published two books entitled "What to Eat Now" and "What to Eat Now – More Please!" to accompany the series'.

Reception
The Guardian commented "do we need a return to the ways of the caveman? Is Valentine Warner the future of TV chefs?" in their review of the series.

Books
Valentine Warner has written two books to accompany the series – What to Eat Now and What to Eat Now – More Please! published by Mitchell Beazley

DVD
A DVD of the first series is now available, distributed by Acorn Media UK.

See also
 Seasonal food

References

 Warner, V. (2008). In "Living" section of "Radio Times", 27 September – 3 October, p24

External links
 
 
 What to Eat Now at Optomen

2008 British television series debuts
2009 British television series endings
BBC high definition shows
BBC television documentaries
British cooking television shows
Television series by All3Media
English-language television shows